Saint Praxedes is a traditional Christian saint of the 2nd century. Her name is sometimes rendered  as Praxedis (Πραξηδίς) or Praxed.

Biography

Little is known about Praxedes, and not all accounts agree. According to Jacobus de Voragine's The Golden Legend, Praxedes was the sister of Saint Pudentiana; their brothers were Saint Donatus and Saint Timothy. During one of the periods of persecution, they buried the bodies of Christians and distributed goods to the poor. De Voragine's brief account states they died in 165, "in the reign of Emperors Marcus and Antoninus II."

Sabine Baring-Gould, in the entry for Saint Novatus, states that the holy virgin Praxedes was a daughter of Saint Pudens, sister of Saint Pudentiana, and that her brothers were Saint Novatus and Saint Timothy. Novatus is said to have died in 151.

Relics
The remains of Práxedes and Pudentiana were buried in the Catacomb of Priscilla, nicknamed the "queen of the catacombs" for its many martyrs and popes. Later, they became associated with a Roman church, Titulus Pudentis, which is presumably named for their father, Saint Pudens, and was also known as the Ecclesia Pudentiana. (This association may have led to Potentiana coming to be known as Pudentiana.) According to the Catholic Encyclopedia, "The two female figures offering their crowns to Christ in the mosaic of the apse in St. Pudentiana are probably Potentiana and Praxedes."

In the 4th century, a Titulus Praxedis church was built, especially connected with the veneration of Saint Praxedis. The relics of Práxedes and her sister were translated to that church, which was rebuilt by Pope Paschal I (817–824), and dedicated to Saint Praxedis.

Churches dedicated to Saint Praxedis 
Santa Prassede church in Rome
Santa Prassede, Todi
Santa Praxedes, Cagayan
Sainte-Praxède, Quebec

Notes

References

External links

Catholic Online
Colonnade Statue in St Peter's Square
 Praxedis av Roma

165 deaths
2nd-century Christian saints
Eastern Catholic saints
Italian Roman Catholic saints
Year of birth unknown
Ante-Nicene Christian female saints